Lussi may refer to:
 Lamar Lussi Athletic Complex, also called "the Lussi", multi-sport high school athletic complex in Lilburn, Georgia
 Swedish celebration of Saint Lucy's Day

People 
 Gustave Lussi (1898–1993), Swiss-American figure skating coach
 Nina Lussi (born 1994), American ski jumper
 Rochus Lussi (born 1965), Swiss artist